Berit Johannessen (born 17 March 1951) is a Norwegian cross-country skier, born in Oslo. She represented the club Fossum IF. She competed in 5 km, 10 km and the relay at the 1976 Winter Olympics in Innsbruck. She was Norwegian champion in 10 km in 1978.

Cross-country skiing results

Olympic Games

World Championships

References

External links

1951 births
Living people
Skiers from Oslo
Norwegian female cross-country skiers
Olympic cross-country skiers of Norway
Cross-country skiers at the 1976 Winter Olympics